Torpè is a comune (municipality) in the Province of Nuoro in the Italian region Sardinia, located about  northeast of Cagliari and about  northeast of Nuoro.

The municipality of Torpè contains the following frazioni (subdivisions): Biddanoa, Talava, Concas, Su cossu, Brunella.

Torpè borders the following municipalities: Budoni, Lodè, Padru, Posada, San Teodoro, Siniscola.

Demographic evolution

References

Cities and towns in Sardinia